Kaludra is a village in the municipality of Berane, Montenegro.

Demographics
According to the 2003 census, the village's population is 267.

According to the 2011 census, its population was 178.

Notable Buildings 
Sveti Luka Monastery (St. Luke Monastery) dating from the 15th century that was mostly destroyed in the 17th century by ruling Ottoman Turks. Restoration works went on for seven months in 2001, but were halted due to the lack of funding owing to stringent economic measures and widespread recession caused by recent sanctions for the country's role in the Yugoslav Wars. The building remains largely neglected with little efforts to further restore the building.

References

Populated places in Berane Municipality
Serb communities in Montenegro